Innocence is a 2011 Czech drama film directed by Jan Hřebejk.

Along with "Kawasaki's Rose" and "Honeymoon", Innocence is part of Hrebejk's loose trilogy of films in which shadows from the past already came to haunt the present of its characters.

Cast
Anna Geislerová as Lída
Ondřej Vetchý as Tomáš
Hynek Čermák as Láďa
Zita Morávková as Milada
Anna Linhartová as Olinka
Luděk Munzar as Mr. Walter
Miroslav Hanuš as Petr
Daniel Czeizel as Štěpán
Alena Mihulová as Kamila
Rebeka Lizlerová as Tereza
Věra Hlaváčková as Zdravotnf sestra
Jiří Šesták as Sexuolog

Awards
Innocence picked up two awards at the 2011 Czech Film Critics' Awards, with recognition going to Anna Geislerová for Best Actress and Hynek Čermák for Best Supporting Actor. The film received nine nominations at the subsequent 2011 Czech Lion Awards, including Best Film, Best Director, Best Leading Actress, Best Supporting Actress, Best Supporting Actor, Best Screenplay, Best Editing, Best Music and Best Poster. Of these, two awards were won: Anna Geislerová for Best Actress and Hynek Čermák for Best Supporting Actor.

References

External links
 Nevinnost at csfd.cz
 Nevinnost at kinobox.cz
 

2011 crime drama films
2011 films
2010s Czech-language films
Films directed by Jan Hřebejk
Czech crime drama films
Czech Lion Awards winners (films)
Czech Film Critics' Awards winners